Buried Fire is a fantasy novel by Jonathan Stroud first published in 1999 by The Bodley Head. It was initially part of the Fire Chronicles, but later the series was disbanded by the publisher. It was supposed to be called The Four Gifts.

Development
The working title for the novel was The Four Gifts.

References

1999 British novels
British fantasy novels
Novels by Jonathan Stroud
The Bodley Head books